Gao International Airport , also known as Korogoussou Airport, is an airport in Gao, Mali.

Airlines and destinations

In addition to civilian travel, Gao serves the adjacent Malian military base Camp Firhoun Ag Alinsar as well as the German military Camp Castor, United Nations civil-military peacekeeping Supercamp (both supporting the United Nations Multidimensional Integrated Stabilization Mission in Mali), and a French military base supporting Operation Barkhane. The Royal Air Force has also deployed Chinook helicopters to Gao.

Accidents and incidents 

 On March 24, 1952, a Lockheed Lodestar of Société Africaine des Transports Tropicaux (SATT), F-ARTE, crashed 1.6 miles (2.5 kilometers) NE of the airport on initial climb, killing 17 of the 21 onboard. The plane was headed to Tamanrasset on the return leg of a round trip from Nice. The crash, the first fatal airliner accident in present-day Mali, was found to be caused by pilot fatigue.

References

External links
 OneSky Jets - Gao Airport
 World-Airport-Codes - Gao (GAQ) Mali
 Aviation Safety Network: Gao Airport

Airports in Mali